York Cemetery is a cemetery located in the city of York, England. Founded in 1837, it now encompasses 24 acres (97,000 m2) and is owned and administered by The York Cemetery Trust with support of the Friends of York Cemetery. It is situated on Cemetery Road in the Fishergate area of York. It has approximately 28,000 graves and over 17,000 monuments, six of which are Grade II-listed. The chapel is a Grade II* listed building,
while the gatehouse, gate and railings are Grade II. The architect of these buildings and the grounds was James Pigott Pritchett.

History

The York Public Cemetery Company was formed in 1837 to provide better burial facilities for the citizens of York – whatever their station in life – than those offered by the overcrowded parish and non-conformist graveyards in the city. Initially, it had to compete with the other graveyards in the city, but, because of their unsatisfactory condition, they were all closed by an Order in Council in December 1854. As a result, it prospered and paid good dividends to its shareholders. By the 1960s, however, with the cemetery nearly full, it became clear that it was no longer financially viable and that the high returns previously enjoyed by the shareholders could not be sustained. With prospects of very little income to pay wages and cover the maintenance of the site the company, in June 1966, went into voluntary liquidation. When the process was completed in 1979, there was nothing of commercial value left, only the land containing over 28,000 graves, 17,000 monuments and two listed buildings in an advanced state of disrepair. The abandoned site devolved to the Crown.

The Cemetery became an overgrown and derelict wilderness. Then in June 1984, the roof of the chapel gave up its unequal struggle against the elements and collapsed bringing down part of the rear wall with it. This single event stimulated a group of local people to take the action, which led to the formation of York Cemetery Trust, a registered charity. After two and a half years of planning, negotiation and fund-raising, the Crown Commissioners sold York Cemetery to the Trust for a nominal sum. On 13 February 1987, the Trust became the owners of the new freehold of the whole site with the responsibility of continuing the burial business, using the site for educational purposes and restoring the chapel and gatehouse. 

Now a small staff of permanent employees, assisted by many volunteers who contribute in many ways, help to maintain and develop the wild and beautiful  site, rich in local history, genealogy and ecology as well as ensuring that it can still continue its original purpose as a burial place for the citizens of York.

Notable interments

 Thomas Cooke (1807–1868), optical instrument manufacturer
 John Phillips (1800–1874), geologist
 John Kenrick (1788–1877), classical historian
 William Hewson (1806–1870), theological writer
 James Pigott Pritchett (1789–1868), architect
 Joseph Terry (1828–1898), confectioner
 John Petty (1807–1868), Primitive Methodist minister
 Lord Roy Sutcliffe (1929–2001). 
 Lady Elizabeth Sutcliffe (1933–1998). 

The cemetery contains the graves of 236 Commonwealth service personnel from both world wars.

References

External links
York Cemetery Main Website
York Cemetery Genealogy Website

Cemeteries in North Yorkshire
Geography of York
1837 establishments in England
Grade II listed buildings in York
Grade II* listed buildings in York
Commonwealth War Graves Commission cemeteries in England